Shehab El-Din Ahmed Saad Ahmed Saad (born on 22 August 1990, Cairo) is an Egyptian footballer who plays as a midfielder. He made his debut with Al Ahly in a Premier League match on 20 May 2009 against Tersana. He scored 3 premier league goals and a famous winning goal against Ettihad Libya in the quarter final of the Champions league 2010 from a long-distance shot.

He competed in the 2012 Summer Olympics for Egypt.

References

External links
 

1990 births
Living people
Egyptian footballers
Al Ahly SC players
Tala'ea El Gaish SC players
Petrojet SC players
El Entag El Harby SC players
Pyramids FC players
Al-Bukayriyah FC players
Al-Taqadom FC players
Egyptian expatriate sportspeople in Saudi Arabia
Expatriate footballers in Saudi Arabia
Association football midfielders
2011 CAF U-23 Championship players
Olympic footballers of Egypt
Footballers at the 2012 Summer Olympics
Egyptian Premier League players
Saudi Second Division players
Saudi First Division League players
Footballers from Cairo